The following is a list of characters that first appeared in the ITV soap opera Coronation Street in 1989, by order of first appearance.

Alison Oakley

Alison Oakley, played by Helen Swift in 1989 and Shelley Willetts in 1998 is a woman who Brian Tilsley meets in a nightclub on 15 February 1989 after splitting from his wife Gail. Brian tries to defend Alison against three young thugs who begin harassing her, which results in Brian being fatally stabbed.  In her first appearance, she is only credited as "Disco Girl" and not by her name. Nine years later, Brian's son Nick seeks her out at a bar to learn the truth about Brian's death. Alison reveals that Brian had goaded his killer, shattering Nick's illusion of his father.

Darren Whateley
Darren Whateley played by Ian Aspinall in 1989 and Andy Robb in 1998 is Brian Tilsley's killer who stabs him when he defends Alison Oakley, a girl he has met at a club, from Darren and two friends. Darren stabs Brian in the abdomen whilst his friends hold him against a wall and leaves him to die in an alleyway. In his first appearance, he is only credited as "Disco Youth" and not by his name. He is subsequently found guilty of murder and sentenced to life imprisonment. Darren reappears in Weatherfield in 1998, by which time he is about to be paroled from his life sentence, when he appears at Brian's son, Nick's college as a guest speaker talking about life in prison. Nick, who was eight years old at the time of the murder, then realises that he is his father's killer. Nick then writes to Darren pretending to be his wife Leanne in order to trap him, however, this backfires, when Leanne's life is endangered after Darren arrives at her home. Leanne and Nick report Darren to the police and he is arrested and his parole is rescinded. He is subsequently returned to prison. However, Leanne and Nick's mother Gail later force Nick to tell the police that he set Darren up.

Tina Fowler

Tina Fowler, played by Michelle Holmes, made her first screen appearance on 13 March 1989. Tina was employed as a barmaid in The Rovers Return following the departure of Gloria Todd (Sue Jenkins). She was interviewed by landlady Bet Gilroy (Julie Goodyear) in the pub during opening hours and given the job shortly afterwards. Curly Watts (Kevin Kennedy) set his sights on Tina however she rejected him. Rovers cellarman Jack Duckworth (Bill Tarmey) became infatuated with Tina, she kept Jack at bay until one day when, for a laugh, she agreed to go out with him on what Jack thought was a date. Tina was happy to spend Jack's money but when he tried to get frisky with her she demanded he drive her home. Jack's wife Vera (Liz Dawn) was furious when she found out about Jack and Tina's "date" and was even more furious when Tina revealed that she only went out with him for a joke which resulted in Vera throwing a pint which missed Tina and drenched landlord Alec Gilroy (Roy Barraclough).

Tina won the 'Newton & Ridley's Barmaid of the Month' competition. Tina almost didn't receive the award she got into a row with Alec. She got revenge by arriving late, making Alec worry that she wouldn't turn up and embarrass the Rovers. The award was presented by Nigel Ridley (John Basham), who was impressed by the young barmaid and starting seeing her in secret. As Nigel was a top brewery director, Tina thought she'd struck gold and started taking liberties at work by not turning up for shifts and demanding a raise. Alec wanted to sack her for that alone, but Bet stopped him after seeing Nigel and Tina kissing. However, when Tina, bored of Percy Sugden (Bill Waddington)'s war stories, told the pensioner that he was barred, Bet sacked her on the spot herself. Tina later saw Nigel at a wine bar to complain about the Gilroys, she found him with a girlfriend and, realising she meant nothing to him, threw a glass of wine over him.

Wendy Crozier

Wendy Papadopoulos (also Crozier), played by Roberta Kerr, made her first screen appearance on 28 June 1989. Wendy worked for the council and had an affair with Ken Barlow (William Roache), which led to his divorce from his wife, Deirdre (Anne Kirkbride).

When Mervyn Watson joined Coronation Street as their new producer, he felt that the serial "needed gee-ing up slightly" and set about making changes. He implemented many fast-paced stories, including Wendy and Ken's affair. The storyline began in September 1989, when Wendy is fired from her job at the Town Hall after she leaks information to Ken. He subsequently offers Wendy a job working for his newspaper the Recorder. By October the pair had begun an affair. Kirkbride told Daran Little in his book The Coronation Street Story that she and Roache were upset by the storyline because it ruined their routine. Roache said that he had a hard time understanding why Ken would be unfaithful again. Wendy and Ken's relationship failed and he attempted to reunite with Deirdre. Wendy departed on 7 May 1990.

On 13 July 2012, it was announced Kerr had reprised her role and Wendy would be returning to Coronation Street later in the year. Wendy reappears again as a potential governor for Bessie Street Primary School and she discovers she is up against Ken for the role. The former couple get reacquainted, but Ken decides to keep Wendy a secret from Deirdre. Of Wendy's return, series producer Phil Collinson stated "Ken's affair with Wendy was one of Coronation Street's defining stories during the 1980s. Viewers were on the edge of their seats as they watched the disintegration of The Barlows' marriage and over 20 years later I hope they will be again. I'm delighted to welcome Roberta back as Wendy and can assure viewers that her reunion with Ken will be one of many must-see storylines this summer" Wendy returned on 24 September 2012.

While working as a secretary for the Council's Planning Committee, Wendy begins leaking information about corruption to Ken, owner of the Weatherfield Recorder. Ken's wife, Deirdre, who is a councillor, finds out about the leaks and warns Ken and Wendy to stay away from each other. When Deirdre is threatened with removal from the committee, she exposes Wendy as Ken's mole. Consequently, Wendy is sacked from her job. Feeling responsible, Ken gives Wendy a position with the newspaper. Ken and Wendy grow closer and they share a kiss when she cooks him a meal for his birthday. They eventually begin an affair and Wendy decides to leave the newspaper so Ken can use the excuse of having to run the office by himself to stay out late. Wendy starts asking Ken to tell Deirdre about their affair and Ken agrees. However, he does not tell Deirdre and Wendy briefly stops seeing Ken. Deirdre finds out about the affair and throws Ken out. Wendy takes him in and helps him run the newspaper, while he sorts out his finances and the divorce. Deirdre demands half of the Weatherfield Recorder's profits and Ken sells the paper to the Gazette. He and Wendy are kept on in their jobs by the new owners. Wendy forms a bond with Ken's daughter Tracy (Dawn Acton). Wendy is offered Ken's job when he leaves the paper and their relationship eventually breaks down. Wendy asks Ken to meet her stepmother, Sylvia (Avril Angers), but they end up arguing in front of her. Ken becomes depressed and admits to Wendy that he should not have left Deirdre for her. He then walks out on Wendy.

Twenty-two years later, Ken runs for the Chair of Governors at Bessie Street School and is shocked to learn Wendy is also a governor at the school. Things between them are initially awkward, but they go for a drink and agree to put the past behind them and focus on the school. Wendy tells Ken that a year after they parted, she married a man called Christos Papadopoulos and moved to Norfolk. However, Christos got sick and died fifteen years later, so Wendy moved back to Manchester. Now remarried to Deirdre, Ken initially tries to keep Wendy's return a secret from her, but she suspects something and follows him to Wendy's house. When Deirdre confronts Ken, he assures her the relationship is purely professional, with Deirdre reluctantly accepting this. However, Wendy later misconstrues Ken's friendliness and makes a pass at him. Ken politely but firmly turns her down, reasserting his love for Deirdre.

Reintroduction

In 2022, Abi Webster (Sally Carman) is placed under the supervision of Wendy - now an experienced foster carer - as part of her attempt to regain custody of her infant son, Alfie. Wendy is unnerved to hear Abi lives on Coronation Street and tries to hide her reluctance to accompany Abi to visit her husband, Kevin Webster (Michael Le Vell). Abi notices Wendy is uncomfortable on the street, and is shocked when they run into Tracy and she is abusive to Wendy, demanding she stays away. Wendy later admits to Abi that she has 'history' with Ken. After being encouraged by Abi to go and see Ken, she pays a visit to No. 1 and the two agree to put things behind them and become friends. She later develops feelings for Ken and after realising that he feels the same way about her, they decide to rekindle their relationship. Following the return of Ken's ex-lover Martha Fraser, she ends their relationship, having felt a lack of romance between them.

Reg Holdsworth

Reginald "Reg" Holdsworth, played by Ken Morley, made his first screen appearance on 25 October 1989.

Supermarket manager Reg was married to Veronica; however, she left him after discovering his affair with a store detective. Rather than slink off wounded into the sunset, Reg approached several of the single women of Coronation Street, starting with Rita Fairclough. They attended a couple of tea dances together and struck up a friendship. To secure his relationship with Rita, Reg rigged a trolley race at the supermarket so that Rita would be the winner. When Rita discovered this, she dropped him and donated the trolley race winnings to a local charity.

In 1993, Reg recognized his former girlfriend Maureen Naylor, stacking shelves at Bettabuy. They had first met in Llandudno in 1968 and fell in love. Now, after 25 years, they began a new relationship. However, Maureen's mother, Maud Grimes, had always disliked Reg, and tried to break up their relationship. Reg, desperate to consummate the relationship, finally lured Maureen to his waterbed, which burst and flooded the shop below. Reg and Maureen married in January 1994 and bought the corner shop from Alf Roberts for £68,000. Maureen managed the shop with her mother behind the till. The three lived in relative harmony - Reg as a member of the Square Dealers - until he was posted to Firman's Freezers to their Lowestoft branch, which meant a long commute. There he began another affair, with Yvonne Bannister. Reg left the street and a heartbroken Maureen behind, to start a new life with Yvonne who was pregnant with his child.

Morley later crossed over his role of Reg into the 1999 Emmerdale video spin-off Emmerdale: Don't Look Now! - The Dingles in Venice. He also reprised the role in 2010 for the DVD special A Knight's Tale, in which he worked for former colleague Curly Watts as an event planner at Tatlock Towers, a medieval castle and tourist attraction. He got sacked after an incident at the event, but was rehired again by Curly. He was attracted to Mary Taylor, who in a December 2010 episode received a Christmas card from him.

Liz McDonald

Liz McDonald, played by Beverley Callard, made her first screen appearance on 27 October 1989. Callard previously appeared in Coronation Street as June Dewhurst in 1984. A few years later, Callard's agent called and told her that the soap's series producer, Mervyn Watson, wanted her to come in for an audition as he had remembered her. The actress won the regular role of the McDonald family matriarch, Liz. The character was married to Jim McDonald (Charles Lawson) and they had twin sons; Steve (Simon Gregson) and Andy (Nicholas Cochrane). During Liz's tenure, she endured being beaten up by Jim, divorce, catfights and numerous love affairs. The storylines made her "one of the Street's best-loved characters."

Jim McDonald

Steve McDonald

Steven James "Steve" McDonald, played by Simon Gregson. The character first appeared on screen during the episode airing on 6 December 1989. He arrived as part of the McDonald family introduced by producer Mervyn Watson along with his twin brother Andy (Nicholas Cochrane) and parents Liz (Beverley Callard) and Jim McDonald (Charles Lawson). Steve's storylines include his many marriages to Vicky Arden (Chloe Newsome), Karen Phillips (Suranne Jones) twice, Becky McDonald (Katherine Kelly), Tracy Barlow (Kate Ford) and Michelle Connor (Kym Marsh), as well as Tracy giving birth to his daughter Amy (Elle Mulvaney) and also depression. In September 2015 Gregson announced a break due to personal reasons, and Steve was off-screen from October 2015 to 22 April 2016 after going to Spain to visit Andy.

Andy McDonald

Andrew “Andy” McDonald, played by Nicholas Cochrane, debuted on-screen during the episode airing on 6 December 1989. He was a regular character from 1989 until 1997, and made guest appearances in 2000, 2004, 2009

Andy was introduced as part of the McDonald family consisting of parents Liz McDonald (Beverley Callard) and Jim McDonald (Charles Lawson) and their twin teenage boys Andy and Steve McDonald (Simon Gregson). Cochrane and Gregson were chosen by producer Mervyn Watson and casting director James Bain from their school in Manchester. Teachers informed them of the chance to join the cast of Coronation Street and they had photographs taken of themselves. One week later they were called to attend an improvisation session with Callard and Lawson who had already been cast in the parental roles. They chose which two actors they liked the most from thirty that auditioned. While their characters are twins, Cochrane was one year older than Gregson.

Cochrane told a reporter from Look-in that his character is "a bit of a devil [and] a bit of a rogue". Andy has "brains and knows it" but often he does not use them. He added that Andy "always enjoys himself, but hates to be told things. He's a sound character, a bit like me, but with brains." However, Andy got on the actor's nerves at times because he acts "like a wimp and never sticks up for himself". While he is gifted in the "brains department" he is easily led into trouble by Steve. Cochrane explained that the only way to end Andy's "problems" would to be given "a good steady girlfriend to sort him out". Gregson told the writer that "the good thing" about the McDonald brothers is that "they stick up for each other [...] they get on most of the time".

Cochrane's first fight scene as Andy occurred when he and Steve clashed over a girl. The actor was sixteen at the time and he told Paul Byrne from the Daily Mirror that it was his "first taste of proper action". The pair had "great fun" as they memorised fight sequence choreography to make it appear as though Andy and Steve were "having a real go at each other". Cochrane and Gregson ended up damaging the set during filming and incurred costs to the props department.

In one storyline Andy decides to drop out of university. But Jim was not happy with his son's decision and they argued. Cochrane told Rob Sharp in the book The Official 1997 Annual of Coronation Street that he loved arguing with Lawson during filming. He explained that Jim's attitude to his decision "infuriated Andy so much that he turned on his dad and branded him a failure". Cochrane enjoyed the scenes because he felt that it "really pushed" him as an actor. Their relationship came under more strain when Andy began drinking which led his alcoholic father back into drinking. The scenes featured Jim challenging Andy to a drinking session. Cochrane told the Daily Mirror's Byrne that it "really frightened Andy to think his dad was going back on the bottle". The pair end up fighting, Crochane and Lawson had rehearsed the scene prior to the actual shoot. He said that he was "in awe" of Lawson's performance; during the shoot "the adrenaline was pumping" for Cochrane so much that he ripped Lawson's shirt.

In 1997, the serial's new producer axed the character during his revamp of the series. Cochrane was filming a scene in the Rovers Return when he was called in to see Park who informed him that he had lost his job. The actor was being paid £60000 to play Andy and he initially worried about his mortgage. He Byrne that Lawson, Callard and Gregson were supportive towards him after they read about his sacking in the national newspapers. Park informed Cochrane that Andy "was in a rut" and they were "struggling to find storylines" for him. Cochrane admitted that he was already aware of this because Andy "was too much of a goody two-shoes". Park suggested that the character needed a break from the series with possibility of a future return. The actor added that "looking at it now, I realise it is probably best for both me and the character."

He makes occasional returns to his former home, attending remarriage of his parents and the wedding of his twin brother, Steve, where he serves as best man. During his return in 2000 for his parents' wedding he has a one-night stand with Toyah Battersby (Georgia Taylor) and then when he returned in 2004 for Steve and Karen (Suranne Jones)'s wedding he is reprimanded by Toyah's mother Janice (Vicky Entwistle).

In June 2008, Steve goes to Spain to visit Andy for their 34th birthday and returns to the Street in July. Andy does not appear on screen. In April 2009, Liz visits Andy after he has injured himself and stays there for several months. In 2009, Andy and Liz return to the Street for Steve and Becky (Katherine Kelly)'s wedding. He leaves Weatherfield with his dad Jim McDonald (Charles Lawson) a week after the wedding.

Others

References

 
 
 

1989
, Coronation Street
Coronation Street